Coltishall is a village on the River Bure, west of Wroxham, in the English county of Norfolk. The village is located within the Norfolk Broads.

Etymology
Coltishall's name is of Old English origin and first attested in the Domesday Book of 1086 in the forms Cokereshala and Coketeshala. From 1200 onwards, it is attested in the contracted form Couteshal(e), in which form it has more or less remained to the present day (the l in the modern spelling is due to hypercorrection). The second part of the name is thought to derive from the Old English word halh ('nook') but the origin of the first part is uncertain; one guess is that it was an otherwise unattested personal name Coccede or Cohhede, and thus meant 'Coccede's nook'. But The Cambridge Dictionary of English Place-Names concludes that "the recorded forms are too few and contradictory for satisfactory explanation".

History
In the Domesday Book, Coltishall is recorded as a settlement of 16 households in the hundred of South Erpingham. The village was divided between the estates of William de Warenne and Roger de Poitou.

In 1231, Coltishall was made a 'free-town' by King Henry III. Furthermore, from the mid-Eighteenth Century, Coltishall was a centre for the malting industry with many wherries being built in the village.

In 1939, RAF Coltishall was opened as a base for the Hawker Hurricanes of No. 242 Squadron RAF, with the famous fighter ace Douglas Bader being based in Coltishall during the Second World War. RAF Coltishall continue to be used by the Royal Air Force until its closure in November 2006 following a Ministry of Defence review. The site is today operated as HM Prison Bure, which houses Male Category C prisoners.

Horstead watermill, close to the village, was one of the most photographed mills in Britain until it burned down in 1963. A reconstructed mill has now reopened due to lottery grants.

Geography
According to the 2011 Census, Coltishall has a population of 1,503 residents living in 692 households.

Coltishall falls within the constituency of Broadland and is represented at Parliament by Jerome Mayhew MP of the Conservative Party.

St. John the Baptist's Church
Coltishall's parish church is of Norman origin and is dedicated to John the Baptist. The church features good examples of James Powell and Sons stained glass windows and evidence of the wealth of the malting families who have lived in Coltishall throughout history.

Notable Residents
John Alen- Archbishop of Dublin, 1529-34
Sir John Alan-  Lord Chancellor of Ireland

Climate
Climate in this area has mild differences between highs and lows, and there is adequate rainfall year-round.  The Köppen climate classification subtype for this climate is "Cfb" (Marine West Coast Climate/Oceanic climate).

References

External links

Broadland
Villages in Norfolk
Civil parishes in Norfolk